Kanipakam is a small mini town in Irala mandal, located in Chittoor district of the Indian state of Andhra Pradesh. Kanipakam is situated at a distance of 11 km from Chittoor city on chittoor-Irala road.

Temple 

Kanipakam is home to a popular Hindu temple of Lord Ganesha called as Kanipakam Vinayaka Temple. It was constructed in the early 11th century CE by the pandian Mannan Maravarman sundara pandian and a siva temple by Kulothunga Chola I and was expanded further in 1336 by the Emperors of Vijayanagara dynasty.

References 

Villages in Chittoor district